Martti Rosenblatt (born 29 December 1987) is an Estonian volleyball player, who currently plays for Järvamaa.

Estonian national team 
As a member of the senior Estonia men's national volleyball team, Rosenblatt competed at the 2009 and 2011 European Volleyball Championships.

Achievements

Clubs 
Baltic League
  2005/2006 – with Pere Leib Tartu
  2006/2007 – with Selver Tallinn
  2007/2008 – with Selver Tallinn
  2008/2009 – with Selver Tallinn
  2009/2010 – with Selver Tallinn
  2010/2011 – with Selver Tallinn
  2011/2012 – with Selver Tallinn
  2013/2014 – with Selver Tallinn
  2014/2015 – with Selver Tallinn

National championship
 2003/2004  Estonian Championship, with Pere Leib Tartu
 2004/2005  Estonian Championship, with Pere Leib Tartu
 2005/2006  Estonian Championship, with Pere Leib Tartu
 2006/2007  Estonian Championship, with   Selver Tallinn
 2007/2008  Estonian Championship, with   Selver Tallinn
 2008/2009  Estonian Championship, with    Selver Tallinn
 2009/2010  Estonian Championship, with    Selver Tallinn
 2010/2011  Estonian Championship, with    Selver Tallinn
 2011/2012  Estonian Championship, with   Selver Tallinn
 2013/2014  Estonian Championship, with    Selver Tallinn
 2015/2016  Estonian Championship, with   Selver Tallinn

National cup winner
 2003/2004  Estonian Cup 2003, with   Pere Leib Tartu
 2005/2006  Estonian Cup 2005, with   Pere Leib Tartu
 2006/2007  Estonian Cup 2006, with   Selver Tallinn
 2007/2008  Estonian Cup 2007, with   Selver Tallinn
 2008/2009  Estonian Cup 2008, with   Selver Tallinn
 2009/2010  Estonian Cup 2009, with   Selver Tallinn
 2010/2011  Estonian Cup 2010, with   Selver Tallinn
 2011/2012  Estonian Cup 2011, with   Selver Tallinn

Beach Volleyball
 2005 5th U20 European Championship, with Elia Lulla
 2007  Estonian Championship, with Elia Lulla
 2014  Estonian Championship, with Mart Tiisaar
 2014 7th World Student Championship, with Mart Tiisaar

Individual 
 2005 Young Estonian Volleyball Player of the Year

References 

Biography at ESBL 

1987 births
Living people
Sportspeople from Viljandi
Estonian men's volleyball players
Estonian expatriate volleyball players
Estonian expatriate sportspeople in Finland
Expatriate volleyball players in Finland